Meldred is a character who appears in literary accounts of post-Roman Britain.  He is identified as a chieftain in part of what is now southern Scotland for a period in the 6th Century. A twelfth century text references a petty king named Meldredus who had ruled in Tweeddale. The village of Drumelzier in Peeblesshire may take its name from him and his seat of power may have been the fort of Tinnis Castle.  He is of interest as a character in the source texts on which the Arthurian romances are based and potentially the first named political leader associated with the Scottish Borders in the post-Roman period.

Death of Lailoken 

In Vita Merlini Silvestris, a twelfth-century source text for the literary character Merlin, Meldred features as the captor of Lailoken, a warrior so traumatised by the scale of the slaughter he witnesses at the Battle of Arfderydd (Arthuret) in 573 that he retreats to the Great Wood of Caledon, where he lives as a wild man.  Lailoken's madness endows him with the gift of prophecy and Meldred holds him captive in his fortress at Drumeller in the hope of extracting prophecies which he can use to his advantage.  During negotiations over his release, Lailoken draws attention to a leaf caught in the queen's wimple which he claims is evidence of an assignation with her lover in the king's garden.  Lailoken secures his release, but the queen takes revenge on him for revealing her affair by arranging to have him ambushed and killed by a gang of shepherds.  Meldred has Lailoken buried in the churchyard to the east of his fortress, close to where the Powsail Burn joins the River Tweed.

Maldred of Allerdale

The sixth-century literary Meldred of Arthurian romance may have been inspired by a much later historical figure, the eleventh century Maldred (Gaelic: Máel Doraid) of Allerdale, referred to by De obsessione Dunelmi as a son of 'thegn Crínán', possibly Crínán, abbot of Dunkeld, which would make him a younger brother of King Duncan I of Scotland. Maldred and his wife Ealdgyth, a daughter of Uhtred the Bold and granddaughter of King Æthelred the Unready, were the parents of Gospatric, Earl of Northumbria and progenitor of the earls of Home and the earls of Dunbar.

References 

Medieval literature